Akmal Rizal Bin Ahmad Rakhli (born 12 December 1981) is a former Malaysian professional footballer who played as a forward. He is well known for his finishing ability and good technique. Apart from that, he is one of the batch of Malaysians to play overseas. He is the current head coach of Penang (U-21).

Club career

Early career
A product of the Kedah youth academy (Kedah Piala President), Akmal with pacy and skilful talent, made his way going abroad to join RC Strasbourg. He made his debut for the RC Strasbourg Academy U-21 which ended in a 3-1 win against FC Köln II and he successfully scored 2 goals in that friendly match. In 2000, to aid his development, the then 19-year-old forward joined FCSR Haguenau on loan.  He had  scoring 11 goals in 22 games and  won Championnat de France amateur 2. On 20 May 2000, during RC Strasbourg tour to Malaysia, Akmal and  Peguy Luyindula helped Strasbourg beat GNK Dinamo Zagreb 2-0 in friendly match at the Shah Alam Stadium.

He also attracted the attention of  former Mainz manager, Jürgen Klopp to signing him for Mainz before he returned to Malaysia and joined Kedah FA.

Kedah FA
In 2002, he return back from abroad and played for his former youth academy team in senior squad. Later, he won 2002 Liga Perdana 2. In 2003 Liga Perdana 1, he scoring 10 goals in 24 games and becoming runner-up with the team at the end of the season.

Selangor FA
He then played for selangor starting season 2006–07 Malaysia Super League.

Kuala Muda Naza FC
in 2009 Malaysia Super League, he joined new promoted club, Kuala Muda Naza.

Kelantan FA
On 12 January 2010, he scored his first goal for Kelantan in a 3-0 win against Johor FA and also becoming runner-up in the league at the end of the season. Later, he finally won his first Malaysia Cup in 2010 Malaysia Cup Final after kelantan beating Negeri Sembilan FA 2-1.

Perak FA
After leaving Kelantan FA, He then joined Perak and reunited with his former national team head coach, Norizan Bakar.

Kedah FA
He made his second debut (first debut in 2002) on 7 January 2013, appearing as a substitute in a 1–0 win against UiTM F.C., and made his full first start for the club in the game against DRB-Hicom Pos Malaysia FC. On 8 March 2013, he scored his first goal for Kedah FA in the 62nd minute against Kuala Lumpur FA. He made 16 appearances with Kedah FA before he agreed to join Sarawak FA for 2014 Malaysia Super League season.

Sarawak FA
On 10 November 2013, Akmal Rizal has officially signed a one-year contract with Sarawak FA after being released by Kedah FA.

Kedah United F.C.
In 2015, Akmal Rizal played with Kedah United F.C. in 2015 Malaysia FAM League.

International career
He represented Malaysia U-23 for the 2001 Sea Games in Kuala Lumpur, Malaysia. He also represents Malaysia U-23 for the Afro-Asian Games Hyderabad, India in October 2003.

In 2002, Akmal was called up for an international friendly match against five times World Cup winners Brazil. He was selected as one of the first eleven to play against Brazilian stars such as Ronaldo and Barca's Ronaldinho.

He has also been called up by Malaysia national football team coach Norizan Bakar for the AFC Asian Cup 2007 in July, co-hosting by 4 countries Thailand, Indonesia, Vietnam and Malaysia.

After retirement from playing
Akmal Rizal retired from playing professionally in 2016. After retiring, he was the co-commentator for live telecasts of Malaysia football in Media Prima Berhad television stations. He also opened a youth football academy in his hometown Jitra, while completing his AFC coaching course, and as of 2017, he holds 'B' license in this course.

In June 2019, he finally completing his AFC coaching course and earned AFC 'A' license.

Managerial career
On 27 December 2019, Akmal was hired to become assistant head coach for Penang FC in 2020 Malaysia Premier League.

In 2022, he then became head coach  for Penang U-21.

International Senior Goals

Honours

Club
FCSR Haguenau
 Championnat de France amateur 2 : 2000

Kedah FA
 Liga Perdana 2 : 2002
 Liga Perdana 1 : Runner-up 2003
 Malaysia Premier League : 2005-06

Selangor FA
 Malaysia Cup : Runner-up 2008
 Malaysia FA Cup : Runner-up 2008

Kelantan FA
 Malaysia Super League: Runner-up 2010
 Malaysia Cup : 2010

International
Malaysia U-23
 SEA Games :  Silver 2001

Manager
Penang U-21

Sukma Games :  Silver 2022

References

External links
 
 Akmal Rizal Ahmad Rakhli's Profile at selangorfc.com 

1981 births
Living people
People from Kedah
Malaysian people of Malay descent
Malaysian footballers
Malaysia international footballers
Malaysian expatriate footballers
Expatriate footballers in Germany
Malaysian expatriate sportspeople in Germany
Expatriate footballers in France
Malaysian expatriate sportspeople in France
RC Strasbourg Alsace players
Kuala Muda Naza F.C. players
Kelantan FA players
Selangor FA players
Perak F.C. players
Sarawak FA players
Kedah Darul Aman F.C. players
2007 AFC Asian Cup players
Malaysia Super League players
Association football forwards
Southeast Asian Games silver medalists for Malaysia
Southeast Asian Games bronze medalists for Malaysia
Southeast Asian Games medalists in football
Competitors at the 2001 Southeast Asian Games
Competitors at the 2003 Southeast Asian Games